The Duet technical routine competition of the 2018 European Aquatics Championships was held on 3 August 2018.

Results
The final was held at 13:00.

References

Duet technical routine